No Limits is the fourth studio album by American Tejano music singer Jay Perez. The album peaked at number seven on the US Billboard Regional Mexican Albums chart. "Una Vez Mas" received a nomination for Song of the Year at the 1998 Pura Vida Music Awards.

Track listing 
Credits adapted from the liner notes of No Limits.

Charts

See also 

 1996 in Latin music
 Latin American music in the United States

References

Works cited 

1996 albums
Sony Discos albums
Spanish-language albums
Jay Perez albums